The Harvard Injury Control Research Center (abbreviated HICRC) is a research center at the Harvard T.H. Chan School of Public Health dedicated to studying injury prevention. In November 2016, the Center received a grant of over $650,000 from the National Institute of Justice to study police shootings. This was one of the few grants that the federal government has given to study gun violence in the last two decades.

Personnel
Director: David Hemenway
Director of the Means Matter Campaign: Catherine Barber
Director of research: Deborah Azrael

References

External links

Harvard School of Public Health